Van Dyne Civic Building, also known as The Court House, is a historic courthouse building located at Troy, Bradford County, Pennsylvania. It was built in 1894, and is a 2 1/2-story, rectangular building, measuring 50 feet wide and 84 feet deep. It has red brick exterior walls and sits on a cut stone foundation.  The front facade features an entrance arch reflecting Richardsonian Romanesque-style design influences.  It also has pointed gable ends, a bracketed cornice, and two tower at either end of the front facade. The building originally served as a courthouse for the western portion of Bradford County.  It also originally housed a bank and insurance company. Court sessions ended in 1923.  In 1916, it was purchased by E. Everitt Van Dyne, who deeded it to the school district and refurbished it as a civic center for the community. Over time, it has also housed the post office and library.

It was added to the National Register of Historic Places in 1974.

References

Courthouses on the National Register of Historic Places in Pennsylvania
Romanesque Revival architecture in Pennsylvania
Government buildings completed in 1894
Buildings and structures in Bradford County, Pennsylvania
National Register of Historic Places in Bradford County, Pennsylvania
Courthouses in Pennsylvania